Riccardo Forster (1869–1939) was an Italian poet, journalist and critic.

Biography 
As a young man, Forster was an exponent of the Julian-Dalmatian irredentists, and for this reason persecuted by the Austrians. He moved to Naples with the help of Gabriele D'Annunzio and Edoardo Scarfoglio. He began to collaborate with Il Mattino as a theater critic.

He founded and directed the cultural magazine, Flegrea, from 1899 to 1901. From the beginning, he sided with fascism, and in 1925 at the behest of Benito Mussolini, became the director of the newspaper. Forster held this position until 1928.

In 1905 he published a book of poems: La fiorita, consisting of sonnets with a neo-romantic and late-scapigliato style. He also wrote a one-act drama, Revelations, and short novellas inspired by D'Annunzio that were published in the magazines of the day.

References

Sources
 Francesco Bruno, Dentro Napoli, Alfredo Guida Editori, Napoli, 2004 
 Matteo D'Ambrosio, Nuove verità crudeli: origini e primi sviluppi del futurismo a Napoli, Alfredo Guida Editori, Napoli, 1990
 Necrol. La morte di R. F. In silenzio (articoli di L.A. Procida e A. Vesce), in Il Mattino, 20 dic. 1938; 
 I. Tacconi, R. F., in Riv. dalmatica, XIX (1938), 4, p. 54; T. Rovito, Diz. dei letterati e giornalisti ital. contemporanei, Napoli 1907, p. 104; 
 F. Barbagallo, Il Mattino degli Scarfoglio, Milano 1979, pp. 70, 115, 208, 210; 
 G. Infusino, La storia del Mattino, Napoli 1982, pp. 113, 167, 179, 291; 
 E. Giammattei, D'Annunzio giornalista a Napoli. I segni del contesto, in D'Annunzio giornalista. Atti del V Convegno internazionale di studi dannunziani, Pescara 1983, pp. 37–39; 
 R. Gisotti, La nascita della terza pagina. Letterati e giornalismo 1860–1914, Lecce 1986, p. 53.

1869 births
1939 deaths
Writers from Zadar
Italian poets
Italian journalists
Italian fascists
Dalmatian Italians